In analytical psychology, the personal unconscious is Carl Jung's term for the Freudian unconscious, as contrasted with the Jungian concept of the collective unconscious. Often referred to by him as "No man’s land," the personal unconscious is located at the fringe of consciousness, between two worlds: "the exterior or spatial world and the interior or psychic objective world" (Ellenberger, 707). As Charles Baudouin states, "That the unconscious extends so far beyond consciousness is simply the counterpart of the fact that the exterior world extends so far beyond our visual field" (Ellenberger, 707).

The personal unconscious includes anything which is not presently conscious but can be. The personal unconscious is made up essentially of contents which have at one time been conscious but have disappeared from consciousness through having been forgotten or repressed. The personal unconscious is like most people's understanding of the unconscious in that it includes both memories that are easily brought to mind and those that have been repressed for some reason. Jung's theory of a personal unconscious is quite similar to Freud's creation of a region containing a person's repressed, forgotten or ignored experiences. However, Jung considered the personal unconscious to be a "more or less superficial layer of the unconscious." Within the personal unconscious are what he called "feeling-toned complexes." He said that "they constitute the personal and private side of psychic life."

References
C. G. Jung. The Archetypes and the Collective Unconscious, 2nd ed., trans. by R.F.C. Hull. Princeton: Princeton University Press, 1969, p. 4.
Henri Ellenberger (1970). The Discovery of the Unconscious: The History and Evolution of Dynamic Psychiatry. New York: Basic Books.

Analytical psychology